Paradise Theatre or Paradise Theater may refer to:

Orchestra Hall (Detroit), known as the Paradise Theatre from 1941 to 1951
Paradise Center for the Arts, a 1929 theater in Faribault, Minnesota, originally called the Paradise Theatre
Paradise Theater (Bronx), a 1929 theater in the Bronx, New York, originally called Loew's Paradise Theatre
Paradise Theatre (album), a 1981 concept album by the rock band Styx
Paradise Theatre (Chicago), a demolished 1928 movie palace and inspiration for the album by Styx
 Paradise Theatre (Toronto), originally operated from 1937 to 2006, reopened in 2019
 The Paradise, a fictional theatre featured in the film Phantom of the Paradise
 The Paradise Rock Club, a music venue located in Boston, Massachusetts, formerly known as Paradise Theater.

See also
Paradise (disambiguation)
Paradise Club (disambiguation)